This is a list of mayors of the city of Locarno, Switzerland. The sindaco chairs the municipio, the executive of Locarno.

Locarno
 
Lists of mayors (complete 1900-2013)